Rachid Koraïchi is an Algerian artist, sculptor, print-maker and ceramicist, noted for his contemporary artwork which integrates calligraphy as a graphic element.

Life and career
Rachid Koraïchi was born on 20 January 1947 in Ain Beida, Algeria into a Sufi family of Qu'ranic scholars and copyists. He received his early art education at the École des Beaux-Arts in Algeria, where he studied calligraphy. Later, he attended the École des Arts Décoratifs and the École des Beaux-Arts in Paris.

His Sufi upbringing has influenced much of his work by giving him an abiding fascination with scripts and symbols. For Koraïchi, writing is sacred and charged with meaning. His work makes extensive use of Arabic calligraphy as well as glyphs drawn from other languages.

He has produced work in varied media, including ceramics, textiles, installation art, metallurgy, painting, and printmaking, and often collaborates with local artisans in his work.

Work
His work has been exhibited very widely, including at the Venice Biennale (2001) and MOMA (2006), and is also in the collection of the National Museum of African Art, Washington D.C.

Selected exhibitions
 1998 Jardin du Paradis, Festival International des jardins. Chaumont-sur-loire. Leighton House, London.
 1999 Global Conceptualism: Points of Origin, 1950s-1980s, Queens Museum of Art, New York.
 1999-2000 Lettres d'Argile, Contemporary Art Museum, Caracas, Venezuela, Limoges and Algeria
 2000 L'Enfant Jazz, Institut de monde arabe, Paris, France
 2001 Beirut's Poem and Path of Roses, National Gallery of Fine Art, Amman, Jordan.
 2002 Rachid Koraïchi: 7 Variations autour de l'Indigo, Marseille, Vieille Charit et Alors Hors Du Temps.
 2003 Africa Informs, October Gallery, London, 2003.

References

External links
Bio from the National Museum of African Art, Smithsonian Institution
Longer bio, arab-art.org - in French

1947 births
Living people
Algerian artists
Algerian contemporary artists
21st-century Algerian people